Thomas Prugger (born 23 October 1971) is an Italian snowboarder and Olympic medalist. He received a silver medal at the 1998 Winter Olympics in Nagano.

References

1971 births
Living people
Italian male snowboarders
Olympic snowboarders of Italy
Snowboarders at the 1998 Winter Olympics
Olympic silver medalists for Italy
Olympic medalists in snowboarding
Medalists at the 1998 Winter Olympics
People from Innichen
Sportspeople from Südtirol
20th-century Italian people